Bryant "Bry" Lawrence Nelson (born January 27, 1974) is a former second baseman and outfielder who is currently a free agent. He played during one season for the Boston Red Sox of Major League Baseball (MLB).

Career
Nelson was originally drafted by the San Francisco Giants as a pitcher in 1992 out of Crossett High School in the 19th round. Nelson was drafted by the Houston Astros in the 44th rounds as a draft and follow in the 1993 amateur draft out of Texarkana College as a short stop. Nelson, played his first professional season with their Class A (Short Season) Auburn Astros in  hitting .322 in his second year switch hitting.  1995 he hit .327 with 3 Homeruns 52 RBI and 34 Doubles. In , he played for four different teams: the New Jersey Jackals of the Can-Am League, the Long Island Ducks of the Atlantic League, and the Sultanes de Monterrey and Piratas de Campeche in the Mexican League.

Nelson was signed by the Camden Riversharks of the Atlantic League on May 30, 2009, batting .300 for them that season. He signed with the Lancaster Barnstormers for the 2010 season.

On June 2, 2016, Bryant Nelson became a member of the Atlantic League 1,000 Hit Club registering his 1,000 league hit off Somerset pitcher Darin Gorski and joining only 2 other players (Jeff Nettles/Ray Navarrete) to achieve this milestone in Atlantic League history.

References

External links

1974 births
Living people
African-American baseball players
American expatriate baseball players in Japan
American expatriate baseball players in Mexico
Auburn Astros players
Baseball players from Arkansas
Boston Red Sox players
Bridgeport Bluefish players
Camden Riversharks players
Charlotte Knights players
Fukuoka Daiei Hawks players
Kissimmee Cobras players
Lancaster Barnstormers players
Leones del Caracas players
American expatriate baseball players in Venezuela
Long Island Ducks players
Major League Baseball outfielders
Mexican League baseball second basemen
Mexican League baseball third basemen
Mexican League baseball outfielders
Major League Baseball second basemen
Nashville Sounds players
Nippon Professional Baseball third basemen
Nippon Professional Baseball outfielders
New Jersey Jackals players
Orlando Rays players
Pawtucket Red Sox players
People from Crossett, Arkansas
Piratas de Campeche players
Potros de Tijuana players
Quad Cities River Bandits players
Rimini Baseball Club players
American expatriate baseball players in Italy
Rojos del Águila de Veracruz players
Southern Maryland Blue Crabs players
Sultanes de Monterrey players
Syracuse SkyChiefs players
Texarkana Bulldogs baseball players
Tigres de Aragua players
Tucson Sidewinders players
West Tennessee Diamond Jaxx players
York Revolution players
American expatriate baseball players in Taiwan
Uni-President Lions players
21st-century African-American sportspeople
20th-century African-American sportspeople